Julolidine is a heterocyclic aromatic organic compound. It has the formula C12H15N.

Synthesis 
The first synthesis of julolidine was first reported by G. Pinkus in 1892.

Applications
This compound and its derivatives have found recent interest as photoconductive materials, chemiluminescence
substances, chromogenic substrates in analytical redox reactions, dye intermediates, potential antidepressants
and tranquilizers, nonlinear optical materials, high sensitivity photopolymerizable materials, and for improving color stability in photography.

References

External links
 

Tetrahydroquinolines
Heterocyclic compounds with 3 rings
Julolidines